Émilie Dequenne (born 29 August 1981) is a Belgian actress. She first gained attention for playing the title character in the film Rosetta (1999), which earned her the Cannes Film Festival Award for Best Actress. She then went on to star in many films such as Brotherhood of the Wolf (2001), The Light (2004), The Girl on the Train (2009), Our Children (2012), Not My Type (2014) and This Is Our Land (2017).

Life and career
Dequenne won the Best Actress award at the 1999 Cannes Film Festival for her debut film performance in the Palme d'Or-winning film Rosetta. Dequenne became more well known with worldwide audiences following her role in Brotherhood of the Wolf, a $29 million-budgeted film that grossed more than $70 million in theaters worldwide. In 2009 she played the lead in André Téchiné's La Fille du RER alongside Catherine Deneuve. She starred in the French thriller film The Pack, which premiered at the 2010 Cannes Film Festival.

In 2012, she won the Un Certain Regard Award for Best Actress award at the 2012 Cannes Film Festival for her role in the film Our Children.
The film also scored her a Magritte Award for Best Actress and a nomination for a Satellite Award for Best Actress.

Filmography

Theater

References

External links

 
 

1981 births
Living people
Belgian film actresses
Walloon people
Magritte Award winners
20th-century Belgian actresses
21st-century Belgian actresses
Cannes Film Festival Award for Best Actress winners